Varun Sood (born 12 October 1990) is an Indian cricketer who plays for Sikkim in Indian domestic cricket. He is a slow left-arm orthodox bowler.

Sood took three wickets for Delhi in a warmup one-day match against ( England )

References

External links 

1990 births
Living people
Indian cricketers
Delhi cricketers